Gifty Twum-Ampofo (born June 11, 1967) is a Ghanaian politician and a Member of Parliament of the New Patriotic Party. She is currently the Member of Parliament for  Abuakwa North constituency in the Eastern Region of Ghana. Ampofo is the deputy minister for Gender, Children and Social Protection in Ghana.

Early life and education 
Gifty Twum-Ampofo was born on June 11, 1967, in Kukurantumi in the Eastern Region of Ghana. She had her BSc. in Biology from the University of Cape Coast in 1997. She further had her MBA in Strategic Management in 2018. She also had her BSc from the University of Ghana.

Career 
Ampofo was a Science tutor at Akosombo International School before becoming a Member of Parliament. She was also the Head of Science Department and Head of Examinations at the Volta River Authority. She is currently the Deputy Minister for Education in charge of Technical and Vocational Education Training.

Politics 
In March 2016, she contested and won the NPP parliamentary primaries for the Abuakwa North Constituency in the Eastern Region of Ghana after the death of Joseph Boakye Danquah-Adu. She later won the Abuakwa North Constituency by-elections with 10,033 votes making 89.60% of the total votes cast whilst the Ghana Freedom Party parliamentary candidate Samuel Frimpong had 263 votes making 2.35% of the total votes cast and United People's Party parliamentary candidate Isaac Kwarteng had 901 votes making 8.05% of the total votes cast.

2016 election 
In the 2016 Ghanaian general election, she won the Abuakwa North Constituency parliamentary seat with 17,838 votes making 59.23% of the total votes cast whilst the NDC parliamentary candidate Victor Emmanuel Smith had 11,754 votes making 39.03% of the total votes cast and an Independent candidate Adjei Danquah Patrick had 524 votes making 1.74% of the total votes cast.

2020 election 
In the 2020 Ghanaian general election, she again won the Abuakwa North Constituency parliamentary seat with 17,653 votes making 53.2% of the total votes cast whilst the NDC parliamentary candidate Charles Yeboah Darko had 15,551 votes making 46.8% of the total votes cast.

Committees 
She is a member of the Public Accounts Committee and also a member of the Foreign Affairs Committee.

Personal life 
She is widowed with three children. She is a Christian and worships as a Methodist.

Philanthropy 
In December 2022, she presented foodstuff to over 35,000 people in her constituency.

References 

Living people
New Patriotic Party politicians
Ghanaian MPs 2017–2021
21st-century Ghanaian women politicians
Women members of the Parliament of Ghana
Government ministers of Ghana
Women government ministers of Ghana
1967 births
University of Ghana alumni
People from Eastern Region (Ghana)
Ghanaian MPs 2021–2025
University of Cape Town alumni